The HAL Rudra, also known as ALH-WSI, is an armed version of the HAL Dhruv utility helicopter which is designed and produced by the Indian aerospace manufacturer Hindustan Aeronautics Limited (HAL). 

The Rudra was developed in parallel to the HAL Light Combat Helicopter (LCH), a more extensive attack helicopter developed from the Dhruv. Extensive changes from the Dhruv were avoided to produce the Rudra with the express purpose of providing an indigenous armed helicopter faster than the LCH programme could do so. The Mark III variant features the sensors and mission equipment, but lacked weaponry; the Rudra Mark IV is provisioned with various armaments. The Rudra is equipped with forward looking infrared (FLIR), day-and-night optical cameras, and a Thermal Imaging Sights Interface; armed models feature a 20 mm turret gun, 70 mm rocket pods, anti-tank guided missiles and air-to-air missiles. Work on the programme started in December 1998, and the prototype Rudra conducted its maiden flight on 16 August 2007.

Between 2011 and 2013, extensive flight testing of the Rudra took place, during which it was proved to have largely fulfilled or surpassed set requirements. Its primary customer is the Indian Army, who took delivery of the first pair of Rudra helicopters in February 2013, the same month in which the type attained Initial Operational Clearance (IOC). In addition to the Indian Army, both the Indian Air Force and Indian Navy have taken interest in the type.

Design and development
Amid the development of the more comprehensive Light Combat Helicopter, an attack-orientated derivative of the HAL Dhruv utility helicopter, Indian Army officials concluded that there was value in procuring an armed model of the Dhruv. By intentionally avoiding any non-essential major modification to the original airframe, this armed Dhruv could be developed and delivered relatively quickly. The concept was initially referred to as the Dhruv-WSI (Weapons System Integrated). Thereafter, the name Rudra was adopted. Development of the Rudra was officially sanctioned during December 1998.

The Rudra features integrated sensors, weapons and an electronic warfare suite; it is also furnished with an upgraded version of the glass cockpit used in the HAL Dhruv Mk III. These sensors include stabilised day and night cameras, infrared imaging, as well as laser ranging and designation. It has an Integrated Defensive Aids Suite (IDAS) from Saab AB, with an electronic warfare self-protection system that is fully integrated into the glass cockpit. Onboard self-defence systems include radar and missile detectors, IR jammer, chaff and flare dispensers. The helicopter can be used in both unarmed and armed roles that include aerial reconnaissance, troop transport, anti-tank warfare and close air support.

During July 2005, the project was rescoped to include integration of additional systems along with the integration of a higher powered model of the HAL/Turbomeca Shakti turboshaft engine. Post-revision, the cost of the Rudra programme was reported to be Rs 710.29 Cr in April 2007; at this point, the scheduled completion date was stated to be July 2008. On 16 August 2007, the prototype Rudra conducted its maiden flight.

In September 2011, the Rudra underwent integration trials of its armaments and electro-optical systems, which included a final round of weapon firing trials, such as of its 20 mm turret gun. Both 70 mm rockets and MBDA Mistral air-to-air missiles were also test fired during November 2011. The helicopter reportedly exceeded both the payload and performance requirements while flying at an altitude of 6 km. 

During September 2012, ground tests were completed using the first production Rudra. It was armed with a turret gun, rockets, air-to-air missiles and could carry air-to-ground missiles like the anti-tank helicopter-launched Nag. Accordingly, HAL was awarded with a combined order for 76 Rudras, these were destined for the Indian Army, who were the type's primary customer, as well as the Indian Air Force (IAF).

Between 2012 and 2013, the Rudra underwent a series of flight trials on behalf of the Indian Navy; it was found that the helicopter was suitable for conducting coastal surveillance operations. The service was reportedly impressed with the capability of the Rudra's sensors to track ships at up to 14 km away. The image quality of the sensors was described as good enough to even read the name of ships at those ranges, and the Navy was keen to order at least 20 helicopters for its own purposes. Prior to this round of testing, the Rudra had been evaluated for the anti-submarine warfare (ASW) mission, weapons tests had included the firing of both torpedoes and depth charges, which had reportedly been completed successfully.

Operational history
The Rudra was expected to attained Initial Operational Clearance (IOC) by late 2012, while deliveries of production helicopters were set to commence by 2013. On 4 February 2013, at the Aero India trade show, it was announced that the HAL Rudra Mk IV had achieved IOC, and that a pair of helicopters had been handed over to the Indian Army. The Indian Army continued to take deliveries of the type; by 2017, 22 armed Rudras had reportedly been delivered to the service.

The Indian Air Force has also received eight armed Rudras by 2017. By 2021, while the more comprehensive LCH was now available, there was still reportedly demand to continue ordering additional Rudras on account of its comparatively cheaper unit cost. In April 2022, a planned $1.1 billion procurement of 48 Russian Mil Mi-17V-5 helicopters intended for the Indian Air Force (IAF), federal interior ministry, and various paramilitaries was scrapped amid an initiative to buy the locally-produced Rudra instead.

Variants

Rudra, or ALH-WSI (Weapon Systems Integrated) has two main versions. 

 Mark III: This version has Electronic Warfare, countermeasures, sensors and targeting systems installed, but does not feature weapons. Utility roles of Defence Services suited for high altitude operations.
 Mark IV: This version has a French Nexter 20 mm turret gun, Belgian 70 mm rockets, and MBDA air-to-air and air-to-ground missiles, such as the Helina anti-tank missile. Armed variant for Attack, Close Air Support and High altitude operations.

Operators

 Indian Air Force – 16 helicopters are in service. 50 more on order.
 Indian Army – 75 helicopters are in service as of June 2021. 25 more on order.

Specifications

See also

References

Citations

Bibliography

External links

 Official Page

Dhruv, HAL
2000s Indian helicopters
Military helicopters
2000s Indian military aircraft
Twin-turbine helicopters
Aircraft first flown in 2007